Andrew L. J. Renaud (born December 27, 1946) was a Canadian politician. He was elected to the Legislative Assembly of Saskatchewan as an NDP member for the constituency of Kelsey-Tisdale in 1991. He was re-elected to a second term in the constituency of Carrot River Valley in 1995, serving until his defeat in 1999.

References

1946 births
Living people
Politicians from Prince Albert, Saskatchewan
Saskatchewan New Democratic Party MLAs
Fransaskois people
20th-century Canadian politicians